Germán Ariel Niz (born 23 March 1996) is an Argentine professional footballer who plays as a centre-back for Deportivo Carchá.

Career
Niz began his career with Arsenal de Sarandí, during which time he was loaned out to Primera B Metropolitana side San Telmo. He made his professional debut on 10 October 2016 in a win against Deportivo Riestra, prior to scoring his first goal a week later versus Tristán Suárez. Niz eventually scored two goals in twenty-two matches during 2016–17. In August 2017, Niz left Arsenal to join San Telmo permanently. Two seasons later, following one goal in forty-four appearances, Niz left for fellow third tier team Deportivo Armenio. He appeared seven times in five months with the club, with his debut coming against Talleres.

In February 2020, Niz completed a move to Guatemalan football with Deportivo Iztapa. His first match in Liga Nacional arrived on 9 February versus Deportivo Siquinalá, with his second appearance prematurely ending after a seventy-fourth minute red card in a win away to Deportivo Sanarate. Despite renewing his contract in June, the centre-back would terminate it in October and subsequently join Deportivo Carchá of the Primera División de Ascenso.

Career statistics
.

References

External links

1996 births
Living people
People from Avellaneda Partido
Argentine footballers
Association football defenders
Argentine expatriate footballers
Expatriate footballers in Guatemala
Argentine expatriate sportspeople in Guatemala
Primera B Metropolitana players
Liga Nacional de Fútbol de Guatemala players
Arsenal de Sarandí footballers
San Telmo footballers
Deportivo Armenio footballers
Deportivo Iztapa players
Deportivo Carchá players
Sportspeople from Buenos Aires Province